Cairo is a 2013 novel by Australian author Chris Womersley.
Cairo is Womersley's third novel.

The novel takes its name from Cairo Flats, a heritage-listed apartment building in Fitzroy, Victoria.

The novel is presented as a reminiscence of "Tom Button", a boy from rural Victoria who inherits an apartment in Fitzroy from a bohemian aunt.  Tom is accepted into a circle of artists and musicians, centred around Max and Sally Cheever, a couple who live in unit 28 of the Cairo Flats. Tom is drawn into a circle that would perpetrate the Theft of The Weeping Woman from the National Gallery of Victoria and would sell it to relocate to France.

The novel includes a number of actual places and venues on Brunswick Street, Fitzroy and in the suburb: Punters Club, the Black Cat cafe, Polyester Records and Rhumbarellas.

References

External links
 Video of the author talking about the novel at Scribe website.

2013 Australian novels
Novels set in Victoria (Australia)
Scribe (publisher) books